The Russian minority in Poland consists of 13,000 people (according to the Polish census of 2011, page 92).

In the past – the times of the Second Polish Republic, partitions of Poland and the Polish–Lithuanian Commonwealth – the number of Russians within Polish borders was much higher, over 100,000. Changing borders (see territorial changes of Poland) and forced resettlement after World War II drastically reduced this number.

One of the most defining cultural characteristics of that minority is their Eastern Orthodox faith.

See also 
Poland–Russia relations
Poles in Russia

References 

Ethnic groups in Poland
Poland
Poland–Russia relations
Russian diaspora in Europe
Polish people of Russian descent